is a Japanese politician of the Liberal Democratic Party, a member of the House of Representatives in the Diet (national legislature). A native of Kanagawa Prefecture and graduate of Keio University, he was elected to the House of Representatives for the first time in 2005 after an unsuccessful run in 2003. He is the son of Shintaro Ishihara, former governor of Tokyo, and like his father affiliated to the revisionist lobby Nippon Kaigi.

See also 
 Koizumi Children

References

External links 
  .

1964 births
Living people
Politicians from Kanagawa Prefecture
Keio University alumni
Koizumi Children
Members of the House of Representatives from Tokyo
Liberal Democratic Party (Japan) politicians
Members of Nippon Kaigi
Shintaro Ishihara